Jack and Jill vs. the World is an American-Canadian film by Vanessa Parise. It was released on April 4, 2008 and stars Freddie Prinze Jr. and Taryn Manning as Jack and Jill.

Plot
Jack (Prinze Jr.) is a thirty-something New York City advertising executive, living a life forged from routine. He is successful and stylish... and extremely bored. Jack meets Jill (Manning) by chance on a rooftop. Jill is looking for an apartment and asks Jack for directions. Jack suggests Jill's name for an ad shoot. Later he drives Jill to her apartment and realizes the neighborhood may not be all that safe. He helps Jill move out of her place and the two move in together by week's end. The pair pieces together a playful manifesto of "rules to live by." Jack's best friend and business partner, George (Stebbings), notices a more playful side to Jack's usual cynicism, and wants to meet the cause.

Jill's free-spirited nature causes some friction, however. When her long absences go unexplained, Jack forces Jill to confess that her disappearances are a result of the treatment she needs for cystic fibrosis, an ultimately terminal illness. Jack is furious with Jill for violating their pact of honesty, and they break up.

A talk with his father Norman (Forster) incites Jack to find Jill. Jack tracks down her wacky friend, Lucy (Parise), and pleads his case. Convinced that he truly loves Jill, Lucy admits that Jill is catching a Greyhound bus cross-country to Hollywood. Jack reevaluates his life, and just as he quits his job, a bomb threat is called in at his work. Jack goes outside and George tells him that the bomb threat was called in by someone who wants to fight ugliness. Jack realizes that the culprit has to be Jill. The two make up, and with their new dog in tow, they hit the highway... with no destination in sight except for a life together.

Jack and Jill's Manifesto of Rules to Live By
Rule 1 Be honest
Rule 2 Believe in fairy tales
Rule 3 Accept time as our friend
Rule 4 Make sure the nookie is good
Rule 5 Promote beauty. Wage a sustained campaign against ugliness
Rule 6 Abandon the pursuit of happiness and its false promise
Rule 7 Show compassion, except to pirates
Rule 8 Less TV
Rule 9 Always be willing to admit when you're wrong

Cast
Freddie Prinze Jr. as Jack
Taryn Manning as Jill
Robert Forster as Norman
Vanessa Parise as Lucy
Kelly Rowan as Kate
Peter Stebbings as George
Ingrid Doucet as Sally
Lisa Ciara as Amberly
Darrin Brown as T-Bone
Claudia Besso as Melony
Krista Sutton as Emily
Julian Richings as Mr. Smith
Ethan Penner as Wyatt
Hannah Lochner as Holly
Charles Martin Smith as Carlin

Reception
The film garnered a mixed reception from critics. According to Reel Film reviews it "ultimately establishes itself as an affable endeavor that benefits substantially from the charismatic work of its two leads." But Robert Abele of the Los Angeles Times concluded that it is "Blind to the fact that it should be rising up against its own formulaic kind."

Music
The soundtrack features music by Canadian indie rock band Stars.

Home media
The film was released on DVD on June 14, 2008.

References

External links

Jack and Jill vs. the World at MySpace
Official Website

Films shot in Toronto
2008 films
American romantic comedy films
Canadian romantic comedy films
English-language Canadian films
2008 romantic comedy films
Films set in New York City
Films about cystic fibrosis
Films directed by Vanessa Parise
2000s English-language films
2000s American films
2000s Canadian films
English-language romantic comedy films